Bharathan is a 1992 Indian Tamil-language action drama film, directed by Sabapathy Dekshinamurthy and produced by A. S. Ibrahim Rowther. The film stars Vijayakanth and Bhanupriya, while S. P. Balasubrahmanyam, Anandaraj, Napoleon, Sumitra, and Chandrasekhar play supporting roles. It is a remake of the Hindi film Ghayal (1990). The film was released on 16 April 1992, and completed a 100-day run.

Plot 
Bharathan is sent to jail for a murder and is sentenced to the death penalty.

In the past, Bharath was in love with Indhu. He had a brother named Ramkumar and a sister-in-law named Janaki. His brother dreamt to see him as a government official, but Bharath preferred to be a kickboxing champion.

One day, Ramkumar disappeared, and Bharath began to look for him. Finally, Ramkumar's labourer explained to Bharath what happened to his brother. Gangadharan, a powerful businessman, helped Ramkumar in his business. Ramkumar was grateful to him, and Gangadharan took some advantages and began to smuggle alcohol illegally in Ramkumar's company. When Ramkumar decided to report it to the police, he was kidnapped by Gangadharan. Gangadharan killed Ramkumar, and the innocent Bharath is arrested for the murder. Bharath appointed his family friend Viswanathan as the advocate, but Viswanathan, an ally of Gangadharan, betrayed him, and Bharath was sentenced to capital punishment. Thereafter, Janaki committed suicide.

In jail, Bharath makes friends with his cellmates, and they escape from jail to punish Gangadharan. Johnson, an honest CID officer, is appointed to protect Gangadharan. Bharath first kills the traitor Viswanathan. He then threatens the commissioner and his family to kill Gangadharan more easily.

In the meantime, Indhu is kidnapped by Gangadharan's henchmen, and Bharath saves her in time. Shameful to protect a criminal and worried to punish an innocent, the commissioner and Johnson try to stop Bharath. In the end, Bharath kills Gangadharan and gets sent to jail.

Cast

Soundtrack 

The music was composed by Ilaiyaraaja.

Reception 
The Indian Express wrote, "Despite the remake of the original being before the eyes, debutant director Saba has been able to warm up for viewers only a lukewarm concoction of various box-office elements".

References

External links 
 

1990s Tamil-language films
1992 action drama films
1992 films
Fictional portrayals of the Tamil Nadu Police
Films directed by Sabapathy Dekshinamurthy
Films scored by Ilaiyaraaja
Indian action drama films
Tamil remakes of Hindi films